François de Vial (October 4, 1904 - May 16, 1984) was a diplomat and a Minister Plenipotentiary of France.

Biography

Born at Château Lynch-Bages, Pauillac, he was the son of general :fr:Félix de Vial.

Education
He attended the :fr:Lycée Saint-Joseph de Tivoli from 1910 to 1918.
He received his BA and law degree in Paris.

Diplomatic career

 Attached to the Consulate of France in Berlin in 1932
 Seconded to the Embassy of France Prague 1933
 Embassy of France in Berne from 1934 to 1935
 Embassy of France in Budapest from 1935 to 1938
 Vice-consul in Naples from 1938 to 1939, he did not join the mobilization center
 Attached to the Embassy of France to the Holy See from 1940 to 1944: Palazzo Taverna Orsini, founded by the Orsini family.

 Consul in Firenze from 1944 to 1949

 General consul in Quebec from 1953 to 1960
 General consul in Liverpool

 Plenipotentiary Minister Embassy of France in Madrid
 Member of  NATO Defense College
 Plenipotentiary Minister in London

Rome Holy See 1942 1944

Sir D'Arcy Osborne, was a British diplomat. He was Envoy Extraordinary and Minister Plenipotentiary to the Holy See 1936–1947. He was one of the group, led by Monsignor Hugh O'Flaherty and a French diplomat François de Vial who both helped conceal some 4,000 escapees, both Allied soldiers and Jews, from the Nazis; 3,925 survived the war.

United Kingdom :Sir Perceval d'Arcy Osborne 12th Duke of Leeds, KCMG (1936-1947) Envoy Extraordinary and Minister Plenipotentiar

United States : Myron Charles Taylor (1939-1950) « Peace Ambassador » and « personal envoy » Myron Charles Taylor

Distinctions 
Righteous Among the Nations 2020

     Officier of the Legion of Honour,

     Commander of National Order of Merit (France)

     Médaille de la Résistance

   Order of the British Empire

  Knight of the Order of Merit of the Republic of Hungary

References

Sources 

 La Course pour Rome : comment la ville éternelle fut sauvée de la destruction nazie, Dan Kurzman, Éditions Elsevier 1977
 French Diplomatic Diary 1950 Edition, 1968 Edition.
 Chadwick, Owen Britain and the Vatican During the Second World War, 1988, Cambridge University Paperback Library, p. 86 et seq.
 Clark, Mark (2007) [1950]. Calculated Risk. New York: Enigma Books. .
 D'Este, Carlo (1990). World War II in the Mediterranean (1942-1945 Major Battles and Campaigns). Algonquin Books. .
 Ellis, John (1993). The World War II Databook: The Essential Facts and Figures for all the combatants. BCA. .
 French general consuls List in Québec :
 "Réception du docteur L.P. Roy"  chronicle from Quebec newspaper  "la Patrie"  
 Economical links with Québec and federal Government 1953 Page 117, 121, 135: letters written by François de Vial to Maurice Schumann, French Foreign Office minister.
 Moseley, Ray. 2004. Mussolini: The Last 600 Days of Il Duce. Dallas: Taylor Trade Publishing.
 " War souvenirs; Pierre Peteul" 
  French Canadian diplomatic relationship :  Mac Gill University Montréal. folio 191,192,205,206 "Réactions du Québec à l' américanisation de la culture".
 Atkinson, Rick (2007). The Day of Battle: The War in Sicily and Italy, 1943-1944 (vol. 2 of The Liberation Trilogy). .
 "Alphonse Juin (1888-1967)" (in French). Académie française. 2009. Archived from the original on 16 February 2009. Retrieved 2009-01-18.
 Tardini, Domenico. 1960. Pio XII. Roma: Poliglotta Vaticana.
 Mgr  Martin, le Vatican inconnu, Fayard, 1988
 Jean Neuvecelle, Église, capitale Vatican, coll. L'Air du temps, Paris, Gallimard, 1954, 
 Charles Pichon, Le Vatican hier et aujourd'hui, Fayard, 1968
 Paul Poupard, Connaissance du Vatican : histoire, organisation, activité, éd. Beauchesne, 1967, extraits en ligne
 Sergio Romano, La Foi et le Pouvoir : Le Vatican et l'Italie de Pie IX à Benoît XVI, Buchet-Chastel, 2007 Résumé en ligne
 Jean-Jacques Thierry :Andrea Lazzarini, Paolo VI, Profilo di Montini, quoted from Papst Paul VI Herder Freiburg, 1964
 Morris, Terry; Murphy, Derrick. Europe 1870–1991.
 Nicholas Horth, Miklós Horthy, Andrew L. Simon, Nicholas Roosevelt, Admiral Nicholas Horthy Memoirs, Simon Publications LLC, 1957
 Raiber, Richard (2008). Anatomy of Perjury: Field Marshal Albert Kesselring, Via Rasella, and the GINNY mission. Newark: University of Delaware Press. OCLC 171287684.
 Boyle, Peter G., ed. (2005). The Eden–Eisenhower correspondence, 1955–1957 University of North Carolina Press. 
 Eisenhower, Dwight D. (1948). Crusade in Europe, his war memoirs.
 Clausson, M. I. (2006). NATO: Status, Relations, and Decision-Making. Nova Publishers. .
 Garthoff, Raymond L. (1994). Détente and confrontation: American-Soviet relations from Nixon to Reagan. Brookings Institution Press. .
 Le Blévennec, François (25 October 2011). "The Big Move". NATO Review. Retrieved 19 December 2011.
 a b Cody, Edward (12 March 2009). "After 43 Years, France to Rejoin NATO as Full Member". The Washington Post. Retrieved 19 December 2011.
 (es) Jesús Palacios et Stanley G. Payne, Franco, mi padre : Testimonio de Carmen Franco, hija del caudillo, Madrid, La Esfera de los Libros, 2008, 791 p. 
 O'Reilly, Charles T (2001). Forgotten Battles: Italy's War of Liberation, 1943–1945. Lexington Books. p. 244. .
 Dalin, David G. The Myth of Hitler's Pope: How Pope Pius XII Rescued Jews from the Nazis. Regnery Publishing: Washington, D.C. 2005; ; p. 76
 Minutes of 7 August 1941. British Public Records Office FO 371/30175
 Cf. The Holy See's official journal Acta Apostolicae Sedis Volume 51, p. 271.
 The Scarlet Pimpernel of the Vatican".
 Stephen Walker (4 March 2011), "The Priest who Outfoxed the Nazis", Irish Times, retrieved 4 March 2011
 "Hugh O'Flaherty Memorial web page". Permanent Memorial. Hugh O'Flaherty Memorial Society. Retrieved February 23, 2013.
 Linteau, Paul-André (1989). Histoire du Québec contemporain; Volume 1; De la Confédération à la crise (1867–1929). Montréal: Les Éditions du Boréal. .
 Linteau, Paul-André (1989). Histoire du Québec contemporain; Volume 2; Le Québec depuis 1930. Montréal: Les Éditions du Boréal. .
 Horthy:, Admiral Nicholas (2000). Admiral Nicholas Horthy Memoirs. Nicholas Horthy, Miklós Horthy, Andrew L. Simon, Nicholas Roosevelt (illustrated ed.). Simon Publications LLC. p. 348. .
 1919 speech of Horthy
 The Battle for Rome: The Germans, The Allies, The Partisans, and The Pope, September 1943-June 1944. New York: Simon and Schuster.
 Portelli, Alessandro (2003). The Order Has Been Carried Out: : History, Memory, and Meaning of a Nazi Massacre in Rome. Macmillan.
 List des consuls généraux français à Québec 
 Liens économiques et échanges avec le Québec et le gouvernement fédéral 1953 Pages 117, 121, 135: lettres de François de Vial à Maurice Schumann, ministre des Affaires étrangères. 
 Relations France Canada : Archives de l' université .Mac Gill Montréal.
 Strange Allies: Canada-Quebec-France Triangular Relations, 1944-1970

Katz, Robert (2003). The Battle for Rome. Simon & Schuster. .
 The Peerage : Sir Percy Godolphin Osborne, 11° duc de Leeds.

See also

 Legion of Honour
 List of Legion of Honour recipients by name (V)
 Legion of Honour Museum

External links
 :fr: Jean-Népomucène de Vial
 :fr:Félix de Vial
 Léon Bérard
 Pious Establishments of France
 Massacre in Rome
 Ardeatine massacre
 Benito Mussolini
 Bombing of Rome in World War II
 Bombing of the Vatican
 Italian Campaign (World War II)
 Père Marie-Benoît
 Operation Shingle
 Charles de Gaulle
 Maurice Couve de Murville
 NATO
 ww2gravestoneoflaherty-hugh-scarlet-pimpernel- 
Hugh-o-Flaherty 

1904 births
1984 deaths
20th-century French politicians
20th-century French diplomats
NATO Defense College alumni
French Resistance
World War II resistance movements
Officiers of the Légion d'honneur
Commanders of the Ordre national du Mérite
Honorary Members of the Order of the British Empire
Order of Merit of the Republic of Hungary
Military alliances involving France